Steve "The Smashing Machine" Mckinnon (born 23 November 1976 in Scotland) is a WBC Hall of Fame, 8 time world champion Australian, Heavyweight kickboxer, fighting out of the Bulldog Gym in Sydney. He competed in Glory and is the former WBC Muaythai Super Cruiserweight World Champion.

Career

McKinnon began his training in his father's Karate school, Torakan, at the age of 4 in Shotokan Karate, attaining his black belt, fighting and winning Karate tournaments before he began his kickboxing career at 16. He faced many notable opponents such as Ashwin Balrak, Paul Slowinski, Nathan Corbett and Ramazan Ramazanov.

He won 8 world titles throughout his career, including winning the WBC world title in 2008 and defending it 3 times. 
He retired vacating that title. 

His last fight was a WKBF world heavy weight title win in 2017.

In 2020 he was inducted into the WBC Hall of Fame.

McKinnon was set to face Nenad Pagonis at Glory 7: Milan in Milan, Italy, but his opponent changed to Michael Duut, whom he lost to via a unanimous decision. He then competed in the eight-man tournament at Glory 9: New York - 2013 95kg Slam in New York City on 22 June 2013 and lost against Filip Verlinden by decision in the quarter-finals.

Titles

 WKBF World Title x 2 (2001 & 2017)

 

 World Boxing Council Muaythai | WBC Muaythai World Super Cruiserweight Champion. X 4 (2008, 2010, 2010, 2012)

 ISKA Australian Cruiserweight title

 IKKC Intercontinental Heavyweight Muay Thai Title

 New South Wales Muaythai Title

Kickboxing record 
{{Kickboxing record start|norec=y|title=Kickboxing record|record=48 Wins (30 (T)KO's), 8 Losses'}}
|-
|-  bgcolor="#CCFFCC"
| 2017-10-14 || Win ||align=left| Joe Boobyer || Powerplay 35 || Melbourne || Decision || 3 || 3:00
|-
|-  bgcolor="#CCFFCC"
| 2017-06-24 || Win ||align=left| Su Zhihao || Wu Lin Feng 2017: Australia VS China || Sydney || Decision || 3 || 3:00
|-
|-  bgcolor="#CCFFCC"
| 2017-02-24 || Win ||align=left| Theodosiadis Panagiotis || Prize Fighter 2 || Melbourne || Decision (Unanimous) || 3 || 3:00
|-
|-  bgcolor="#FFBBBB"
| 2015-04-17 || Loss ||align=left| Zabit Samedov || GFC Fight Series 3, Semi-finals || Dubai, UAE || Decision (Unanimous) || 3 || 3:00
|-
|-  bgcolor="#CCFFCC"
| 2014-11-15 || Win ||align=left| Nato Lauuii || Capital Punishment – The Return of Bangin' Ben Edwards || Canberra, Australia || KO (Right High Kick) || 1 || 
|-
|-  bgcolor="#CCFFCC"
| 2013-11-23 || Win ||align=left| Nikolaj Falin || Kings of Kombat 11 || Australia || Decision (Unanimous) || 3 || 3:00
|-
|-  bgcolor="#CCFFCC"
| 2013-08-17 || Win ||align=left| David Radeff || Star Wars: War of the Year || Sydney || Decision || 3 || 3:00
|-
|-  bgcolor="#FFBBBB"
| 2013-06-22 || Loss || align=left|  Filip Verlinden || Glory 9: New York – 95 kg Slam Tournament, Quarter Finals || New York City City || Decision (majority) || 3 || 3:00
|-
|-  bgcolor="#FFBBBB"
| 2013-04-20 || Loss || align=left|  Michael Duut || Glory 7: Milan || Milan, Italy || Decision (Unanimous) || 3 || 3:00
|-
|-  bgcolor="#FFBBBB"
| 2012-09-01 ||Loss ||align=left| Nathan Corbett || Total Carnage II || Gold Coast, Australia ||Decision (Unanimous) ||5 ||3:00 
|-  bgcolor="#CCFFCC"
| 2012-06-09 || Win ||align=left| Frank Muñoz || Singha Battle for the Belts || Bangkok, Thailand || KO || 1 || 
|-
! style=background:white colspan=9 |
|-
|-  bgcolor="#CCFFCC"
| 2012-03-17 || Win ||align=left| Nato Lauuii || Capital Punishment 5 || Canberra, Australia || TKO (Elbows) || 3 || 
|-  bgcolor="#CCFFCC"
| 2011-02-? || Win ||align=left| David Radeff || Enfusion Kickboxing Tournament '11, 2nd Round, super fight || Koh Samui, Thailand || Decision (Unanimous) || 3 || 3:00
|-
|-  bgcolor="#CCFFCC"
| 2010-12-19 || Win ||align=left| Stephane Susperregui ||WCK Muay Thai || Hainan Island, China || Decision (Majority)  || 5 || 3:00
|-
! style=background:white colspan=9 |
|-
|-  bgcolor="#CCFFCC"
| 2010-11-06 || Win ||align=left| Eduardo Maiorino || Immortality 3|| Sydney || TKO  || 2 || 
|-
! style=background:white colspan=9 |
|-
|-  bgcolor="#CCFFCC"
| 2010-06-09 || Win ||align=left| Paul Slowinski || Last Man Standing 2 Tournament, Semi-final || Melbourne || Decision (Majority) || 3 || 3:00
|-  bgcolor="#CCFFCC"
| 2010-06-09 || Win ||align=left| Andonis Tzoros || Last Man Standing 2 Tournament, Quarter Finals || Melbourne ||  ||  || 
|-  bgcolor="#CCFFCC"
| 2009-11-13 || Win ||align=left| Hrvoje Kišiček || Immortallity Australia vs Croatia || Sydney || TKO (Cut) || 2 || 3:00
|-  bgcolor="#FFBBBB"
| 2009-07-17 || Loss ||align=left| Yu Jin ||  2009 World Wushu Tournament −80kg Semi-finals || Guangzhou, China || Decision (unanimous) || 5 || 3:00
|-
|-  bgcolor="#CCFFCC"
| 2009-07-17 || Win ||align=left| Muslim Salikhov || 2009 World Wushu Tournament −80kg Quarter Finals || Guangzhou, China || Decision || 5 || 3:00
|-
|-  bgcolor="#CCFFCC"
| 2009-05-14 || Win ||align=left| Thor Hoopman || Immortality II: Battle of Gods || Sydney || Decision || 5 || 3:00
|-
|-  bgcolor="#CCFFCC"
| 2008-06-20 || Win ||align=left| Ashwin Balrak || International Muay Thai Fight Night || Montego Bay, Jamaica || Decision (unanimous) || 5 || 3:00
|-
! style=background:white colspan=9 |
|-
|-  bgcolor="#CCFFCC"
| 2008-03-29 || Win ||align=left| Thor Hoopman || Xplosion 18 Super Fights || Sydney || Decision (Unanimous) || 5 || 3:00 
|-  bgcolor="#FFBBBB"
| 2007-12-08 || Loss ||align=left| Ramazan Ramazanov || Xplosion 17, WMC Intercontinental title 95 kg || Sydney || KO (Right hook) || 4 || 2:51
|-
! style=background:white colspan=9 |
|-
|-  bgcolor="#FFBBBB"
| 2006-08-18 || Loss ||align=left| Nathan Corbett || Xplosion 13 || Sydney || TKO (Doctor stoppage) || 4 || 
|-
|-  bgcolor="#CCFFCC"
| 2006-06-24 || Win ||align=left| Jay Hepi || K-1 Kings of Oceania 2006 Round 1 || Auckland, New Zealand || TKO (Injury) || 2 || 
|-  bgcolor="#CCFFCC"
| 2005-6-14 || Win ||align=left| Simon Dreus || Castle Hill muay thai  || Las Vegas, USA || KO || 1 || 2:45
|-
! style=background:white colspan=9 |
|-
|-  bgcolor="#CCFFCC"
| 2004-04-16 || Win ||align=left| Gareth Lewis ||  || Sydney || KO (High kick) || 4 || 
|-  bgcolor="#CCFFCC"
| 2004-02-29 || Win ||align=left| Wissam Fattal || Tarik Solak Presents – Kickboxing Gala NSW || Sydney || KO (Left high kick) || 2 || 
|-  bgcolor="#CCFFCC"
| 2002-12-13 || Win ||align=left| Alofa Solitua || No Mercy || Sydney || TKO || 3 || 
|-  bgcolor="#FFBBBB"
| 2001-09-01 || Loss ||align=left| Paul Slowinski || JNI Promotions, Star City || Australia || KO (Left Highkick) || 3 || 1:52
|-  bgcolor="#CCFFCC"
| 2000-10-27 || Win ||align=left| Shane Meads || JNI Promotion || Sydney || KO || 1 || 1:30
|-
! style=background:white colspan=9 |
|-
|-
| colspan=9 | Legend'':

References

External links

 

1976 births
Living people
Australian male karateka
Australian male kickboxers
Heavyweight kickboxers
Australian Muay Thai practitioners
Shotokan practitioners
Scottish emigrants to Australia
Sportspeople from Glasgow
Kickboxers from Sydney